Consentual Selections is the first best of album by California ska punk band Mad Caddies, released on July 20, 2010.

Track listing
"Backyard" - 3:02 (from Keep it Going, 2007)
"Leavin" - 2:59 (from Just One More, 2003)
"No Hope" - 1:28 (from Duck and Cover, 1998)
"Drinking For 11" - 3:54 (from Just One More)
"Mary Melody" - 3:08 (from Rock the Plank, 2001)
"State Of Mind" - 3:47 (from Keep it Going)
"Falling Down" - 3:10 (from The Holiday Has Been Cancelled, 2000)
"Just One More" - 3:26 (from Just One More)
"The Bell Tower" - 2:41 (from Quality Soft Core, 1997)
"Monkeys" - 2:46 (from Duck and Cover)
"Days Away" - 3:44 (from Rock the Plank)
"Silence" - 2:47 (from Just One More)
"Road Rash" - 1:57 (from Duck and Cover)
"Whatcha Gonna Do" - 3:09 (from Keep it Going)
"All American Badass" - 2:28 (from Rock the Plank)
"Reflections" - 3:14 (from Keep it Going)
"The Gentleman" - 2:17 (from Duck and Cover)
"Last Breath" - 3:21 (from Just One More)
"Popcorn" - 3:48 (from Duck and Cover)
"Tired Bones" - 2:53 (from Keep it Going)
"Preppie Girl" - 2:35 (from Quality Soft Core)
"Weird Beard" - 2:42 (from Rock the Plank)
"Save Us" - 2:19 (previously unreleased)
"Why Must I Wait" - 4:01 (previously unreleased)

References

2010 greatest hits albums
Fat Wreck Chords compilation albums
Mad Caddies albums
Albums produced by Ryan Greene